A. bigelovii may refer to:

Allium bigelovii, the New Mexico wild leek, a flowering plant species
Amaranthus bigelovii, a flowering plant species
Artemisia bigelovii, the Bigelow sagebrush, a flowering plant species